Elizabeth Joan Peacock (née Gates; born 4 September 1937) is a British Conservative politician and former Member of Parliament for the West Yorkshire constituency of Batley and Spen.

Peacock served as a North Yorkshire County Councillor from 1981 to 1984, and represented Batley and Spen from 1983 to 1997, during which time she was the Parliamentary Private Secretary to Nicholas Scott as Minister for Social Security and Disabled People Unit (1992). Peacock was opposed to abortion, and sometimes advocated direct action. In the debate on the Abortion Amendment Law in January 1988, she was a supporter of the Bill, speaking out for lowering the time-frame in which a legal abortion is permitted, originally standing at 28 weeks, in the Abortion (Amendment) Bill. Peacock stood again in the 2001 election, unsuccessfully, and declined to stand in the 2005 election.

She was interviewed in 2012 as part of The History of Parliament's oral history project.

Peacock continues to be interviewed occasionally on political issues; for example, in April 2019 she appeared on the BBC's regional politics programme, Sunday Politics, supporting Brexit.

In reference to the 2021 Batley and Spen by-election, Peacock said that the respect must be earned in the Red wall.

References

External links 
 

1937 births
Living people
Members of North Yorkshire County Council
Conservative Party (UK) MPs for English constituencies
Female members of the Parliament of the United Kingdom for English constituencies
UK MPs 1983–1987
UK MPs 1987–1992
UK MPs 1992–1997
20th-century British women politicians
20th-century English women
20th-century English people
Women councillors in England